The Noor Abu Dhabi Solar Power Plant is the world's largest single-site solar power plant as of November 2022, located near Abu Dhabi in Sweihan. The plant has 3.2 million solar panels. 

Noor translates to Light in Arabic. 

The plant provides power for 90,000 individuals in Abu Dhabi. It uses a waterless robotic technology to clean the solar panels. The robots travel a distance of 1600 kilometres every day to clean it. 

The plant is operated by Sweihan PV Power Company which comes under the  Abu Dhabi National Energy Company (TAQA). It is a joint venture between the Abu Dhabi Government and a consortium of China's Jinko Solar Holding and Japan's Marubeni Corp. The plant was commissioned by India-based solar epc contractor Sterling and Wilson Solar. The plant produced a total of 2000 GWh at an efficiency rate of 93%, giving electricity to 66000 houses in September 2020.

History 
The commercial operations of the plant started on April 30, 2019.

Records/Achievements 
It attracted the world's most competitive tariff bid in 2016 that was 8.888 fils/kWh. Other awards include Utility Project of the Year at the 2020 Middle East Solar Awards and the Power Generation Project of the Year at the MEED Projects Awards 2020.

References 

Solar power stations in the United Arab Emirates